Owens Branch is a  long 1st order tributary to West Branch Gum Branch in Sussex County, Delaware.

Course
Owens Branch rises at Owens, Delaware and then flows south to join West Branch Gum Branch about 4 miles northeast of Greenwood.

Watershed
Owens Branch drains  of area, receives about 45.3 in/year of precipitation, has a topographic wetness index of 680.04 and is about 9% forested.

See also
List of Delaware rivers

References

Rivers of Delaware
Rivers of Sussex County, Delaware
Tributaries of the Nanticoke River